William da Silva Oliveira (born May 31, 1984 in São Paulo, Brazil) is a former Brazilian soccer midfielder.

Career
Born in Brazil, Oliveira began playing with local sides União Bandeirante FC and Vitória Futebol Clube. He signed with Trinidadian club W Connection's youth system in 2003, and played for the club for four years. After a brief trial period, Oliveira was signed to the Chicago Fire of Major League Soccer on May 24, 2007.  However, Oliveira was released before the end of the season.

References

External links
 Profile at MLSNet

1984 births
Living people
Brazilian footballers
Brazilian expatriate footballers
União Bandeirante Futebol Clube players
Vitória Futebol Clube (ES) players
Chicago Fire FC players
W Connection F.C. players
TT Pro League players
Expatriate footballers in Trinidad and Tobago
Expatriate soccer players in the United States
Brazilian expatriate sportspeople in Trinidad and Tobago
Major League Soccer players
Association football midfielders
Footballers from São Paulo